Anancaun is a small hamlet located in Ross-shire, Scotland, within the Scottish council area of Highland.

References

Populated places in Ross and Cromarty